Attheya armata is a species of diatoms in the genus Attheya.

References

Protists described in 1994
Ochrophyte species
Coscinodiscophyceae